E-Bay Queen is Dead is a compilation album by the Greek synthpop duo Marsheaux. It was released on 29 April 2012 by Undo Records.

Band member Sophie Sarigiannidou describes the CD as a "compilation with unreleased material from our archives." The CD contains original unreleased work, as well as remixes of old Marsheaux tracks and cover versions of songs by Billy Idol, OMD, The Human League and New Order.

The CD's cover and title parodies that of The Smiths' 1986 album, The Queen is Dead. Half of the release featured Marianthi adopting a similar pose on the CD's cover, with Sophie appearing on the remainder.

Track listing

Standard edition

References

External links
 Official site
 Undo Records site

2012 albums
Marsheaux albums